A kard is the equivalent in the Persian language for knife.

In the specialist jargon, Kard is considered a type of knife found in the Persianate societies like Persia, Turkey, Armenia and all the way to India. It has no guard, and usually the handle  was bone, ivory, or horn. It was mostly a stabbing weapon, and commonly the point would be reinforced to penetrate chain mail. A major characteristic of a kard is that the hilt is only partially covered by the sheath.

References

Knives
Indo-Persian weaponry